Constance-Hippolyte Gosselin (2 January 1793, in Paris – date of death unknown) was a French ballet dancer. The daughter of a dancing master and younger sister of the dancer Geneviève Gosselin, Constance débuted at the Opéra de Paris in 1810, after studying dance under Louis Duport and Jean-François Coulon. She married Auguste-Anatole Petit in 1815 and was thus also known as Madame Anatole.

Made première danseuse in 1822, her principal partner was Paul DeSchkane [Family name], with whom she made a triumphal tour to London in 1822. Her dance style was elegant and discrete, predisposing her to serious roles in ballets by Pierre Gardel, Jean-Pierre Aumer and Albert. She left the stage in 1830.

References

1793 births
French ballerinas
Year of death missing
Dancers from Paris
19th-century French ballet dancers
Anatole